Rosel may refer to:

People
 August Johann Rösel von Rosenhof (1705–1759), German miniature painter and naturalist
 Carlos Rosel (born 1995), Mexican football player
 Peter Rösel (born 1945), German concert pianist
 Rosel George Brown (1926–1967), American science fiction author
 Rosel H. Hyde (1900–1992), Americal politician
 Rosel Walther (1928–2006), German politician
 Rosel Zech, German theater and film actress
 Rosel Boycott, also known as Rosie Boycott, Baroness Boycott (born 1951), British journalist and feminist

Places
 Rosel, Calvados, commune in the Calvados department in the Normandy region in northwestern France
 Rosel or Rozelle, a former estate; see Eglinton Castle, Ayrshire, Scotland